A shotel is a curved sword originating in northern Ethiopia. The curve on the blade varies from the Persian shamshir, adopting an almost semicircular shape. The blade is flat and double-edged with a diamond cross-section. The shotel was carried in a close fitting leather scabbard which was often decorated in precious metals and worn on the right side.

History
Evidence of the shotel dates to Dʿmt and the Axumites, having been used by both mounted and unmounted warriors. After the Solomonic restoration of Atse Yekuno Amlak, the resurgent emperors began to organize their armies in a similar manners to the Aksumites, culminating in the reign of Atse Amda Seyon I. Shotel wielders, known as shotelai or hanetay and organized in the Axurarat Shotelai, comprised one of the elite forces of Amda Seyon's Imperial host. Along with the Hareb Gonda and Korem cavalry, Keste Nihb archers and Axuarat Axuarai lancers were said to be the forces that "flew through the air like the eagle and spun on the ground like the avalanche", by a contemporaneous historian. Shotel techniques among others included hooking attacks both against mounted and dismounted opponents that had devastating effect especially against mounted cavalry. The shotel could be used to hook and rip the warrior off the horse. Classically, the shotel was employed in a dismounted state to hook the opponent by reaching around a shield or any other defensive implement or weapon.

Due to increased trade with the west, over time the shotel began to be replaced in the southern Kingdom of Shewa and Shewan dominated Ethiopian Empire by swords fitted with European sabre blades known as gurade.

Design
Its shape, similar to a large sickle, was effectively used to reach around an opponent's shield and stab them in vital areas such as the kidneys or lungs. While closely resembling the Afar gile, the gile has two cutting edges, while the shotel's upper edge is unsharpened and sometimes braced against the swordsman's shield for strength. The shotel and other Eritrean and northern Ethiopian swords are occasionally referred to collectively in Geez as han'e.

The mid-18th century European visitor to Eritrea and northern Ethiopia, Remedius Prutky, often used the word shotel to describe a carving knife.

See also
Sickle sword, a similar weapon used by the Bronze Age Canaanites, Israelites and Ancient Egyptians
Falx, a curved weapon used by the ancient Thracians

References

External links

Blade weapons
African swords
Ethiopian culture
Weapons of Ethiopia